The RIT Tigers women's ice hockey team is one of two hockey teams representing Rochester Institute of Technology in suburban Rochester, New York. The team moved to NCAA Division I women's ice hockey as a member of College Hockey America after many years at Division III as part of the ECAC West conference. The Bruce B. Bates Women's Hockey Coach is former RIT player and captain Celeste Brown.

History
RIT added women's varsity hockey for the 1975–1976 season.  After many years in the ECAC East, RIT moved to the ECAC West league for the 2007–08 season.  The team made three NCAA tournament appearances at the Division III level, in 2007, 2011, and 2012, with a record of 5–2 in tournament games.  They lost their lone game in the 2007 campaign to Amherst College.  In their 2011 campaign, the lady Tigers lost at home, in the Frozen Four final, to Norwich University.

In 2012, the Tigers won their first national championship, on home ice, against Norwich University.  It was the third-ever national championship for RIT's athletic program and first in women's sports.

On March 20, 2012, RIT announced that the women's team would move up to Division I for the 2012–13 season, as the men's team did six years prior. The Tigers joined the College Hockey America conference.

After a successful first season at the division I level going 16–16–5, even after losing their first DI game 6–2 to the Mercyhurst Lakers, the Tigers advanced to the CHA semifinals where they fell to the Syracuse Orange 2–1 in overtime. The next season was yet another season to remember. The Tigers participated in the Frozen Frontier. A 10-day hockey festival at Rochester's Frontier Field. The Tigers fell to Clarkson University 6–2. The Tigers went on to win 11 out of their last 18 to win the CHA championship 2–1 in double overtime against the team that defeated them in their first ever division I game, the Mercyhurst Lakers.

In 2014–15, their first season at the 4,300-seat Gene Polisseni Center, the Tigers went 15–19–5 and finished in last place in the CHA. But they won every game in the 2015 CHA Tournament, beating Robert Morris, Mercyhurst, and then Syracuse, 2–1 in double overtime, to capture their second straight CHA championship. The trophy this year came with the CHA's first-ever automatic bid to the NCAA Tournament, where the Tigers fell 2–6 to the eventual champions, #2 Minnesota.

In 2015, Bruce Bates, an MIT trustee emeritus and women's ice hockey season ticket holder, donated RIT's first athletic endowment to the women's ice hockey team, to support the head coach position.

On July 10, 2018, it was announced that long-time head coach Scott McDonald would be stepping down as head coach of the women's hockey team. He left as the all-time victory leader for the women's team, compiling a 205-154-29 record in 12 seasons. Chad Davis was announced as his replacement on August 22, 2018 with former Buffalo Beauts player Hannah McGowan being hired as assistant coach. On April 30, 2020, it was reported that RIT parted ways with Davis and McGowan as coaches. Davis compiled a 24-37-9 record in two seasons as head coach.

On July 17, 2020, former RIT women's hockey player and captain Celeste Brown was named the next head coach of the program.

Year by year

Current roster
As of August 29, 2022.

Award winners

National

Laura Hurd Award winners 

 2011: Sarah Dagg '11

All-Americans 

 2009–11: Sarah Dagg '11
 2011: Tracy Galbraith '11
 2011: Katie Stack '11 (second team)
 2012: Kristina Moss '13
 2012: Laura Chamberlain '14 (second team)
 2012: Kourtney Kunichika '14 (second team)

Coach of the Year

Tournament MVP 
2012: Laura Chamberlain, '14

ECAC West

Coach of the Year 
2011: Scott McDonald
2009: Scott McDonald (tie)

Player of the Year 
2011: Sarah Dagg '11

Tournament MVP 
2011: Kourtney Kunichika '14
2012: Kim Schlattman '13

College Hockey America
 Mackenzie Stone – RIT, 2016–17 CHA Best Defensive Forward
 Caitlin Wallace – RIT, 2016–17 CHA Individual Sportsmanship
 Lindsay Grigg – RIT, 2014–15 CHA Best Defensive Forward
Taylor Thurston – RIT, 2014–15 CHA Individual Sportsmanship

Weekly Honors
Cassie Clayton, CHA Player of the Week (Week of March 9, 2015)
Ali Binnington, CHA Goaltender of the Week (Week of March 9, 2015)

All-Star Honors
Terra Lanteigne – RIT, 2016–17 CHA All-Rookie Team
Reagan Rust: 2015–16 CHA CHA All-Rookie Team
Christa Vulglar: 2014–15 CHA CHA All-Rookie Team

Tournament All-Stars
Ali Binnington, 2015 CHA Tournament MVP 
Cassie Clayton, 2015 CHA All-Tournament Team
Lindsay Grigg, 2015 CHA All-Tournament Team
Morgan Scoyne, 2015 CHA All-Tournament Team

Player histories
Sarah Dagg was recognized as the 2011 ECAC West Player of the Year after contributing to the Tigers program-record 26 wins. In addition, she helped the Tigers to their first conference regular season and post-season championships. Her points total for the season was 18 goals and 24 assists in 30 games.

In her senior season, Dagg advanced to the 2011 NCAA Division III Championship game. In her four seasons at RIT, the Tigers accumulated a won-loss record of 85–17–7, while finishing as the Tigers all-time leading scorer. Her career totals stand at 63 goals and 91 assists, while competing in 109 games. She is the Tigers all-time assists leader while recording three consecutive forty point seasons. In addition, she is second all-time at RIT with 20 power-play goals, while she stands tied at first place in shorthanded goals with nine.

Tigers in professional hockey

CWHL Draft picks

PHF Draft picks

See also 
 RIT Tigers men's ice hockey

References

External links
 

 
Sports in Rochester, New York